972 Cohnia is a minor planet orbiting the Sun, one of several such in the asteroid belt. It was discovered on 18 January 1908 by a team in Heidelberg led by Max Wolf. In 2007, lightcurve data showed that Cohnia rotates every 18.472 ± 0.004 hours.

It is named after the German astronomer Fritz Cohn.

References

External links 
 
 

000972
Discoveries by Max Wolf
Named minor planets
19220118